Agriotes pallidulus is a species of beetle in the family Elateridae and the genus Agriotes.

Description
Beetle in length 4-6mm. That has yellow/orange – dark orange colors. That has dark head, sometimes its pronotum color is orange. The species legs and antennaes are yellow, orange.

References

External links
Information and Images of Agriotes pallidulus

Beetles described in 1807
Elateridae